Edgewood College is a private Dominican college in Madison, Wisconsin. The college occupies a  campus overlooking the shores of Lake Wingra.

History
The Edgewood College property was bought in 1855 by Mr. Ashmead from Governor Leonard J. Farwell and later developed by Samuel Marshall. He added to the land by planting trees, formal gardens, and climbing grapevines on trellises. Governor Cadwallader Washburn purchased Edgewood Villa in 1873, making it his home. Later, he donated it to the Dominican Sisters for educational purposes.

In 1881, St. Regina Academy, a private boarding school for girls, was opened. On September 15, the first 16 boarding and day students were welcomed to the school. During its first years, the academy's tuition was $165 per year, but music lessons were an additional $8 to $12 per quarter.

In 1893, because of increased growth, construction of a new building was undertaken. It incorporated a granite cornerstone inscribed with the word "Veritas," ("truth"), the motto of the Dominicans. Shortly after its completion, on the night of November 16, a devastating fire took the lives of three of the youngest children attending Regina Academy. The villa and a nearly completed new building were also destroyed.  The future of the school was in doubt after this fatal fire, but the Sisters were determined to “stick and hang”.  A benefit concert was quickly organized by friends of the Dominican Sisters at the Fuller Opera House on Capitol Square on the night of November 28; the success of the benefit inspired the Sisters to rebuild at once.

Rebuilding started in 1894, at a cost of $36,719. The new school, now called Sacred Heart Academy, admitted its first 40 students on September 5, 1894 (Paynter 1,21,23,26). The campus was subsequently expanded to include a high school and an elementary school, both of which are still in operation. In 1927, Edgewood staff requested support for the academic recognition of a junior college for women in Madison from the President of the University of Wisconsin–Madison. In May-, 1927, they received approval for the college. Since student enrollment continued to increase, a new building was completed in 1927.

The junior college: 1927–1940
Edgewood Junior College opened on September 4, 1927, with an enrollment of 12 women. Sister Grace James was the first prioress and principal; each prioress was also the “president” of the college. Mathematics, English, art history, music, philosophy, speech, religion, biology, French, Latin, Greek, and German were offered. Tuition was less than $600 a year (Paynter 31, 32) (Gilligan 39). The school's opening as a college allowed the school to grant diplomas, degrees, and distinctions for proficiency in the arts and sciences. As a junior college, Edgewood offered a two-year program in liberal arts. The second year saw 14 women enrolled as freshmen and eight as sophomores. In the next decade, enrollment averaged about 30 students per year, and change came slowly because of the Great Depression. During the period from 1927 to 1940, the development of Edgewood College was closely connected to the high school, as the organizations shared facilities, services, and faculties.

The senior college: 1940–1949
Thirteen years after Edgewood Academy became Edgewood Junior College, it became Edgewood College, a four-year college. In 1941, the Wisconsin Department of Public Instruction granted one-year approval for the college to award Bachelor of Science in Education degrees in 1942.  In the spring of 1942, Edgewood College received accreditation from the University of Wisconsin; in June of the same year, the first 25 students received their Bachelor of Science degrees in education.

The college grew slowly, attracting a few young women to its four-year program. It saw an influx of older students, however, and many Dominican Sisters chose to earn degrees in elementary education. The college's summer sessions also attracted students, climaxing in the summers of 1943 and 1944 with the presence of the world-renowned musician Nadia Boulanger of the Ecole Normale in Paris.[10] In 1948, the first international students were enrolled: two from Shanghai, China; one from Cali, Colombia; and one from Arequipa, Peru.  The first two African-American students were admitted in the 1949–1950 school year and the first African-American faculty member, Sharon Wexler, was hired in 1956.

A larger college: 1950–1968
In August 1950, Sister Mary Nona McGreal was appointed president of the college and prioress of the Sisters. A new academic criterion was adopted in 1950-1951: seniors were administered the Graduate Record Examination and sophomores a series of tests from the American Council on Education. Several campus organizations, including Kappa Gamma Pi, the national Catholic Honor and Activity Society, were also established in 1951. Meanwhile, more students with different backgrounds and cultures enrolled in the college: black students, Vietnamese, Hondurans, Germans, and Colombians. Additionally, the college began in 1951 to assist in students’ preparation as teachers of Saturday classes to involve them in catechetical instruction in the parishes of the Diocese. Edgewood's chorus also formed a broadcast choir to present live programs for the Madison Catholic Hour.

In 1954 the college began for the first time to receive its share from the Wisconsin Foundation of Independent Colleges (later the Wisconsin Association of Independent Colleges and Universities (WAICU)), where Sister Nona held the presidency from 1966 to 1968. The fund allowed Edgewood to expand campus space for academy and students’ activities. Edgewood was steadily expanding, adding new buildings and extensions through the support of congregations, alumni, and other donors. Edgewood Campus School, designed as a grade school, was built during this period. In 1955, a new addition (“Marshall Junior”) was built to adjoin the east and south sides of Marshall Hall. Mazzuchelli Biological Station was completed on the shores of Lake Wingra in 1956.

The college held membership in the Council for the Advancement of Small Colleges (CASC) to collaborate with other colleges on a national level. In 1959, Edgewood joined the Association of American Colleges, which further enhanced its opportunities for accreditation. Two years later, the college was recognized by the Accreditation of Teacher Education (NCATE); this was finally formalized in May 1962.

In 1950, there were 84 full-time students and a total enrollment of 142. By 1966, there were 744 full-time students, and a total enrollment of 1,067. The faculty profile also changed from an almost exclusive roster of Dominican Sisters to a more diverse assortment. In 1954, for the first time, the college faculty was officially separated from the high school faculty. In 1955, there were 12 full-time faculty; ten years later there were 67.[11][12]

Turbulent years: 1968–1977
In February 1968, Sister Cecilia was appointed president. Under her leadership a new curriculum reduced the number of semester hours required for graduation from 128 to 120; changed courses on two-credit and four-credit basis; and revised the core requirements for humanities, natural sciences, social science, religious studies and studio arts. In the next year, a continuing education program in day and evening schedules had begun and quickly grew from fewer than 100 students to over 500 in 1977.

In the winter of 1970, a major decision was made—Edgewood College became co-ed. This helped increase enrollment and sports participation.

Meanwhile, the Associate of Arts two-year program was re-instated in 1974. The Educational Development Committee of the college proposed a Human Issues program in 1975, requiring students to complete a "human issues experience" before qualifying for graduation. [11][12]

Transition years: 1977–1987
During the presidency of Sister Alice O’Rourke, Edgewood faced numerous challenges, including the declining enrollment of traditional-age college students and cost increases. To alleviate the financial burden, the college initiated a significant fund-raising program in the late 1970s to celebrate the campus centennial year 1981 (campaign "Edgewood Century II"). Meanwhile, the nursing program received $146,800 from the U.S. Department of Health and Human Services to implement its first year project. In the same year $61,000 was granted by the National Science Foundation to strengthen undergraduate science education.

In 1979, some new programs began: a baccalaureate program in nursing, a weekend degree program for business majors, a "Communication Skills" component of the new general education requirements, and an "Education for Parish Service" by the Religious Studies department. Even though the college had an enrollment of 479 in 1978–1979, enrollment was up to 667 in 1982 as the new programs began. In December 1983, the baccalaureate nursing program was accredited by the National League of Nursing. In 1985, faculty formalized a new interdisciplinary academic program when the Women's Studies minor was approved. The North Central Association approved the master's degree programs in business, education, and religious studies in 1986.

In 1983, when Sister Mary Ewens became the president of Edgewood College, she dealt with budget deficits, causing the elimination of the position of the Human Issues director, the athletic director, the inter-collegiate department program, and all theater courses and student productions. Over the next few years, the college received many sustaining gifts and donations from companies and foundations, with the largest donation of $50,000 coming from the Oscar Rennebohm Foundation in 1985.

Building boom: 1988–2002
In 1988, for the first time in the school's history, a president was selected who was neither female nor a Dominican Sister: James Ebben. During his tenure, the gym was renovated to meet minimum requirements for capacity and court length, and renamed the Todd Wehr Edgedome to honor its primary donor; this coincided with plans to rebuild the college's athletic program. At the same time, relationships with neighborhood associations, the community and the other Edgewood schools were gradually established or restored.

With a grant from the Oscar Rennebohm Foundation, Weber Hall reconstruction began in 1990. Weber Hall had first been constructed in the mid-1960s. With construction of this new hall, the college required a new road to the campus; in response, it created Pleasure Drive along Lake Wingra, a scenic lakeshore drive connecting Edgewood to Vilas Park. The drive allowed parents to drop their children at the Campus School, reducing traffic on other streets. In 1994, a newly constructed residence hall was dedicated to Sister Marie Stephen Reges. Also called “Stevie” Hall, this was the first new residence hall constructed since Weber Hall in the 1960s.

Library construction also began in 1990. Built with a reading and reference area with windows overlooking the campus and Lake Wingra, the library included the Bernadine Clapp Archives, a computer lab, and classrooms.

In May 1997, Edgewood received a conditional use permit that included a multi-story science building and a parking structure, a new main entrance to campus, and reconstructed athletic fields. Construction of the Sonderegger Science Center was completed in 1999; the Sonderegger family and the Oscar Rennebohm Foundation had donated $3,000,000 to Edgewood for its construction. (The Sonderegger building was intended to be used by the college, high school, and grade school as a shared science facility.) The same year, the Henry J. Predolin Humanities Center was dedicated.

Meanwhile, efforts to raise the retention rate resulted in a change in retention of 62% in 1994 to 75% in 2001, when full-time students numbered 1217. The demographics of the student body also changed dramatically: the proportion of Roman Catholics among the students was 88% in 1958, but only 38% in 2001. The number of international students peaked in 1997, with 116 students from 30 countries. With the support of national funding, the college strengthened its international ties by visiting countries in Asia .

The North Central Association accredited master's degree programs in Nursing Administration and Marriage and Family Therapy in 1994. In 1999, the Commission on Collegiate Nursing Education accredited the nursing programs. Two programs (Honors program and the Challenge program) targeting the needs of specific groups of students were developed during the late 1980s.

The college's newest undergraduate degree program (the Bachelor of Business Administration degree) began in the fall of 2002.

Edgewood College today: 2002–present
As of Spring 2011, 2,650 students were enrolled at Edgewood College. About 1550 of those were undergraduates and 700 in graduate programs. Edgewood College tries to maintain freshman class size at around 300.

Campus
Marshall Hall, which is located on the hillside overlooking the campus is the oldest building on campus. The hall was erected in the late 19th century and later renovated into living quarters.

There are two cafés, Phil's and Wingra. Phil's, the first campus dining facility to earn Green Restaurant Certification, provides a more traditional dining experience compared to the grab-and-go style of Wingra Cafe.

Edgewood College has a variety of housing, both on and off campus.  The LEED-Silver certified Dominican Hall of 2007 houses students in single and double rooms, within suites. Edgewood offers co-educational housing as well as all girls’ singles in Regina Hall and boys' singles in Marshall Hall. Some students live on campus in more apartment lifestyle housing in the Weber and Sienna Heights Apartments. Much of on campus housing has a prime view of the shores of Lake Wingra. Edgewood also offers off-campus living in area apartment buildings.

The Stream is Edgewood College's visual and theatre arts center. It houses the Art and Theatre Arts Departments and is home to the Edgewood College Gallery and The Black Box, the college's theatre. The building overlooks the surrounding woods and Lake Wingra.

In 2006, Edgewood College became the first college in Wisconsin to be Green Tier Certified by the Wisconsin Department of Natural Resources.

Oscar Rennebohm Library
The Oscar Rennebohm Library, a  structure, was completed in 1991. Overlooking Lake Wingra, it has a collection of over 120,000 books, newspapers, videos, journals, microforms, music, computer software and K-12 curriculum materials, along with media rooms, and approximately 140 computers. Edgewood's Library website also provides access to full-text journals, electronic book collections, and other online databases. Edgewood students have the privilege of using the University of Wisconsin–Madison libraries and the Madison Public Library system because of arrangements with those libraries.

Academics
Edgewood College offers more than 60 majors and 40 minors, as well as individualized undergraduate programs. It also has graduate programs. Many of the graduate programs are housed on the Deming Way campus, nine miles west of the main campus. The college also offers international study and internship programs. More than 75% of classes have fewer than 20 students and the average class is 15 students.
 Edgewood has a student-to-teacher ratio of 13-1 and a student retention rate of 33%. Edgewood's Career Services Department offers professional help in resume writing, mock interviewing, job assistance, and one-on-one student counseling.
The college's agreement with the University of Wisconsin system allows Edgewood students to take classes Edgewood does not offer. Edgewood allows the credits and grades to appear on students' transcripts.  To participate, students must pay tuition to Edgewood and maintain solid academic standing.

Edgewood belongs to over 30 associations and is accredited by the Higher Learning Commission of the North Central Association of Colleges and Schools. Its business program is accredited by the Association of Collegiate Business Schools and Programs, its nursing program by the Commission on Collegiate Nursing Education (CCNE) and the Wisconsin State Board of Nursing, and its teaching and administration programs by the National Council for Accreditation of Teacher Education.

Edgewood offers the Collaborative program option for students who want to take classes that apply to their major through the University of Wisconsin–Madison. Students in this program can take one class per semester and not more than five credits per year from the university.

Student life
Edgewood College features a variety of resources on its campus. Regular events include Brewer games, Friday After Class (FAC), cook-offs, Mazzuchelli Fest, and holiday parties, and are announced in the campus newspaper On the Edge, published every three weeks during the academic year.

Performing arts
Performing arts at Edgewood began in the early 1960s with  the production of Synge's Riders to the Sea. In the next four decades, performances have included Gypsy, Dead Man Walking,  The Glass Menagerie, and The Importance of Being Earnest, as well as a number of Shakespearean plays. The Performing Arts Department typically puts on four productions a year, for which anyone from the community can audition. Students also direct their own one-act plays every other year. Edgewood offers several theater scholarships.

The Performing Arts Program at Edgewood College has two other organizations: an Improv group named Wacktastics, and the student-operated Theatre Assembly, which provides information, resources, and activities students who want to participate in theatre.

The Music Department features a diverse array of performing organizations, including choirs, orchestra, band, jazz ensemble, chamber groups, and Western African and Middle Eastern drumming. 25% of all undergraduate students enroll in a music course each semester. In addition, there are performing opportunities for Madison-area community members.

Athletics
The Edgewood athletic teams are called the Eagles. The college is a member of the Division III level of the National Collegiate Athletic Association (NCAA), primarily competing in the Northern Athletics Collegiate Conference (NACC) since the 2006–07 academic year. The Eagles previously competed in the defunct Lake Michigan Conference (LMC) from 1974–75 to 2005–06; as well as competing in the Midwest Collegiate Conference (MCC) of the National Association of Intercollegiate Athletics (NAIA) only during the 1988–89 school year (while holding dual affiliation membership with the NAIA and the NCAA).

Edgewood competes in 19 intercollegiate varsity sports: Men's sports include baseball, basketball, cross country, golf, lacrosse, soccer, tennis, track & field and volleyball; while women's sports include basketball, cross country, golf, lacrosse, soccer, softball, tennis, track & field and volleyball; and co-ed sports include eSports.

History
Women's athletics began in 1975, when the school was in the Wisconsin Independent Colleges Women's Athletic Conference (WIC-WAC). The men's athletic teams were originally in the Wisconsin Conference of Independent Colleges in 1974. In 1981, the conference changed its name to the Lake Michigan Conference (LMC). In the 1989–90 season, the members of the WIC-WAC women's conference joined the LMC, so that the men's and women's programs were in the same conference.

The 2005–06 season was the final year of the LMC. In 2006, all LMC members merged with the Northern Illinois-Iowa Conference (NIIC) members to form the Northern Athletics Conference, an NCAA Division III athletic conference.

Edgewood College has a dance team that performs at home athletic events and during Homecoming.

Accomplishments
In the Lake Michigan Conference, Edgewood won 35 conference titles. Men's athletics won eight conference titles; men's basketball in 1991–92, 1992–93, 1996–1997, 2000–2001, men's golf in 2005, men's soccer in 1996 and 2000, and baseball in 2005 and 2006. The women's athletics won 27 conference titles; women's basketball in 1991–1992, 1992–1993, 2000–2001, 2004–05, women's cross country in 2003, women's soccer in 1994-2000 and 2005, softball in 1994, 1996, 2005, 2006, women's golf in 1999 and 2004, women's tennis in 1991-1997 and 2000, and volleyball 1994 and 1996.

In 2009 the Edgewood College cross country men's team took first place at the NAC conference meet and the women's team took second, both the best team finishes in program history.

Club sports
Edgewood also offers intramural sports including basketball, volleyball, soccer, bowling, and yoga.

Facilities
Today the sport areas for the teams at Edgewood consist of the Todd Wehr Edgedome (volleyball and basketball), Breese Stevens Field, Madison (soccer), Yahara Golf Course, Madison (women's golf), the Oaks Golf Course (men's golf), McKee Farms Park, Fitchburg (tennis), Verona Little League Complex, Verona (softball), and Stampfl Field, Verona (baseball).

Edgewood's fitness center, which is free to Edgewood students and faculty, is located in the lower level of the Sonderegger Science Center. It provides equipment ranging from treadmills, ellipticals, bicycles, free weights, and selectorized weight equipment. The facility is also equipped with six televisions.

Notable alumni

Jeff Erlanger, American advocate and activist
Meg Johnson, American poet and lecturer.
Alexis Herman, 23rd U.S. Secretary of Labor
Dianne Hesselbein, member of the Wisconsin State Assembly

Footnotes

References

 Sister Mary Clare Gilligan, A History of Edgewood, unpublished Master's thesis (Chicago 1948)
 Annals of the Convent of the Sacred Heart, Vol.1 (1855–1955), Vol.11 (1955–1971)
 Annals of the Convent of the Sacred Heart (Madison, Wisconsin): p. 95
 Bulletin Announcing the Opening of Edgewood Junior College on file in Dean's Office at Edgewood College) (Sister Barbara Beyenka, A Jubilee History. pp. 5–6
 Edgewood College Bulletin 1927–1928. “Fifty Years at Edgewood College,” Vol. 9 (Spring 1977) 9.
 Annals of the Convent of the Sacred Heart (Madison, Wisconsin): p. 99
 Edgewood College Annals (1962–1963): p. 36
 Edgewood College Annals (1940–1941): p. 205
 Edgewood College Bulletin 1927–1928. “Fifty Years at Edgewood College,” Vol. 9 (Spring 1977) 26
 Bulletin of Edgewood College, Madison, Wisconsin, 1947, p. 10
 Sister Barbara Beyenka, A Jubilee History.

External links
 
 Official athletics website

 
Education in Madison, Wisconsin
Educational institutions established in 1927
Dominican universities and colleges in the United States
Tourist attractions in Madison, Wisconsin
Buildings and structures in Madison, Wisconsin
Catholic universities and colleges in Wisconsin
1927 establishments in Wisconsin